Isaac Amissah-Aidoo is a Lawyer  and Ghanaian politician. He was a member of the first parliament of the second Republic of Ghana. He represented Assin constituency under the membership of the progress party (PP).

Early life and education 
He was born in 1927. He is an alumnus of the University of Ibadan where he received his Bachelor of Arts degree in law. He also attended University of Dublin where he obtained another Bachelor of Arts degree in Law and later attended Trinity College where he obtained his Masters of Arts degree in Law. He worked as a Lawyer (Practitioner of law) before going into Parliament.

Personal life 
Amissah-Aidoo is a Christian.

Politics 
He began his political career in 1969 when he became the parliamentary candidate for the Progress Party (PP) to represent the Assin constituency in the Central Region of Ghana prior to the commencement of the 1969 Ghanaian parliamentary election.

He was sworn in to the First Parliament of the Second Republic of Ghana on 1 October 1969, after being pronounced the winner of the 1969 Ghanaian election held on 26 August 1969.

He was the Deputy Speaker of the National Assembly in 1969.

References 

1927 births
Living people
Progress Party (Ghana) politicians
20th-century Ghanaian lawyers
Ghanaian MPs 1969–1972